Peter Watson (born 1950), is a male retired cyclist who competed for England.

Cycling career
Watson won the King of the Mountains in the 1973 Tour of Britain and recorded 19 career victories from 1968-1982.

He represented England in the road race, at the 1974 British Commonwealth Games in Christchurch, New Zealand.

References

1950 births
English male cyclists
Cyclists at the 1974 British Commonwealth Games
Living people
Commonwealth Games competitors for England